Gottfried II of Raabs (died ) was Burgrave of the medieval Burgraviate of Nuremberg, jointly with his brother Conrad I, from 1105 until his death.

Life 
Gottfried II was a member of the edelfrei von Raabs family.  He was the son of Gottfried I of Gosham and the grandson of Ulrich of Gosham, the ancestor of the von Raabs dynasty, who ruled an area northwest of Melk in the area when the House of Babenberg ruled the Margraviate of Austria.  The von Raabs family was named after their first castle, Burg Raabs an der Thaya, in Lower Austria.

In 1105 Nuremberg Castle and the city of Nuremberg were partially destroyed during the conflict between Emperor Henry IV and his son Henry V.  In order to better protect the castle and the city in the future, Henry IV appointed the brothers Gottfried II and Conrad I of Raabs as burgmann of Nuremberg castle, with the title official of "Castellan".  Thus, they became the first  Burgraves of Nurembert.  Gottfried's son Gottfried III was the first member of the family to be called burggravius of Norimburg in an official document.

After Gottfried II died, around 1137, Conrad I ruled Nuremberg alone.  After Conrad's death, Gottfried's son Gottfried III inherited the Burgraviate.

References 
 Sigmund Benker and Andraes Kraus (eds.): Geschichte Frankens bis zum Ausgang des 18. Jahrhunderts, founded by Max Spindler, 3rd ed., Beck, Munich, 1997, 
 Norbert Angermann (ed.): Lexikon des Mittelalters, vol. 6, Artemis & Winkler Verlag, Munchen, 1993, 

Burgraves of Nuremberg
House of Raabs
11th-century births
1137 deaths
12th-century German nobility